Bulverhythe (also known as St Leonards Bulverhythe) was a temporary railway station on the Brighton Lewes and Hastings Railway in Bulverhythe, now part of Hastings, East Sussex.

History 
A temporary terminus named "Bulverhythe" was opened on 27 June 1846 on a site near the Bull Inn on the modern day A259 Bexhill Road pending the construction of a bridge over the River Asten. The station remained open for just under six months, before the line was extended to a permanent station at St Leonards West Marina in November 1846. The Brighton, Lewes & Hastings Railway was taken over by the London, Brighton and South Coast Railway in 1847.

Present day 
St Leonards West Marina station closed in 1967 and the only remaining station in the West St Leonards area is West St Leonards.

References 

Disused railway stations in East Sussex
Former London, Brighton and South Coast Railway stations
Railway stations in Great Britain opened in 1846
Railway stations in Great Britain closed in 1846
1846 establishments in England
Transport in Hastings